Delice or Delices may refer to:

Places

 Delice, a town and district in Kırıkkale province, Turkey
 Delice (İmranlı) a village in Sivas province, Turkey
 Delice, Mudurnu, a village in Bolu province, Turkey
 Delice River, a river in Turkey
 Delices, a village in Dominica
 Délices, a gold mine and village in French Guiana
 Les Délices, a former home of Voltaire

People
 Patrick Delice, a retired athlete from Trinidad and Tobago

Companies 

 , a Tunisian dairy company

Other uses
 Délice d'Argental, a double cream cheese
 Délice de Bourgogne, a type of cheese
 Delice Paloma, a 2007 film